Byng may refer to:

Places
 Byng, Oklahoma, a small town in Pontotoc County
 Byng Inlet, Ontario, a ghost town in Parry Sound District
 Manor of Byng, Suffolk, England

People
 John Byng (disambiguation), several people with the same name, including:
 John Byng (1704–1757), British admiral, sentenced to death by court martial and shot
 George Byng (disambiguation), one of several Viscounts Torrington, most notably:
 George Byng, 1st Viscount Torrington (1668–1733), British Admiral and statesman
 Julian Byng, 1st Viscount Byng of Vimy (1862–1935), British general during World War I, later Governor General of Canada and involved in the King-Byng constitutional crisis
 Several Earls of Strafford, including:
 Edmund Henry Byng, 6th Earl of Strafford (1861–1951), president of Middlesex County Cricket Club
 Georgia Byng, British author of children's books

 James Byng, British actor

 James W. Byng, British botanist
 Jamie Byng, Canongate Books publisher
 Thomas Byng (died 1599), English academic and lawyer

Others
 The Lady Byng Memorial Trophy for sportsmanship in the National Hockey League
 Lord Byng Secondary School, Vancouver

See also
Bing (disambiguation)